Bald Mountain Pass (elevation ) is a high mountain pass in the high Uinta Mountains in Duchesne County in eastern Utah. United States. It is the highest point on the Mirror Lake Highway (Utah State Route 150), near the trailhead for Bald Mountain. The highway is the highest paved road in Utah.

References

External links

Landforms of Duchesne County, Utah
Mountain passes of Utah
Features of the Uinta Mountains